Teceu may refer to:

Teceu Mare, the Romanian name for Tiachiv, Zakarpattia Oblast, Ukraine 
Teceu Mic, a village in Remeți Commune, Maramureș County, Romania